Emile Francis Short is a Ghanaian judge and academic and the first Commissioner on Human Rights and Administrative Justice in Ghana.

Early life and education 
Short was born on February 6, 1943, in Cape Coast, Gold Coast  to Joseph Short, a Sierra Leonean lawyer and Wilhelmina Short, née Smith, a Fante who was of partial Sierra Leonean descent through her paternal grandfather, Francis Smith (judge), a justice of the Supreme Court of the Gold Coast. He started is early education at the Jubilee School, Cape Coast. At age 12, he was enrolled to St. Augustine's College in Cape Coast for his O and A Level certificates. Upon completion of his secondary education, short furthered to the University of London where he studied LLB degree in law. He was called to the Bar in England in 1966 after studying for Barrister-at-Law certificate  at Lincoln's Inn. He obtained a Master's degree in Law (LL. M.) from the London School of Economics and Political Science.  He was called to Ghana Bar in 1973, after studying Orientation course in customary law at the Ghana School of Law. He also hold a honorary doctorate from Northwestern University in Illinois.

Career 
Short started his legal career in sierra Leon, where he was appointed as a state Attorney in 1968 after teaching briefly at Middlesex Polytechnic in London, United Kingdom. He started his legal practice in Ghana in 1974 and headed Max-Idan Chambers in Cape Coast. He lectured at the University of Cape Coast in the Central Region of Ghana and He also serve as a consultant for the United Nations Development Programme (UNDP), the Commonwealth Secretariat in London, and the Carter Center in the United States.

He was appointed the Commissioner for Human Rights and Administrative Justice in Ghana at the beginning of the Fourth Republic in 1993 by President Jerry Rawlings.

In 2004, he took indefinite leave from his position at CHRAJ to be the Ad Litem Judge with the United Nations International Criminal Tribunal for Rwanda at Arusha in Tanzania after he had been elected to that position by the United Nations General Assembly. This was during the prosecution for war crimes in Rwanda. He returned to his position at CHRAJ in August 2009. He retired in December 2010.

Short has also advised on international law, human rights and administrative justice on various occasions.

Selected awards

References

External links
Emile Short on World Bank website

Living people
20th-century Ghanaian lawyers
Ghanaian people of Sierra Leonean descent
Ghanaian people of Jamaican descent
Ghanaian people of British descent
Alumni of the London School of Economics
St. Augustine's College (Cape Coast) alumni
Fante people
1943 births
21st-century Ghanaian judges